The men's tournament in volleyball at the 2020 Summer Olympics was the 15th edition of the event at the Summer Olympics, organised by the world's governing body, the FIVB, in conjunction with the IOC. It was held in Tokyo, Japan from 24 July to 7 August 2021. It was originally scheduled to take place from 25 July to 8 August 2020, but due to the COVID-19 pandemic, the IOC and the Tokyo 2020 Organising Committee announced on 24 March 2020 that the 2020 Summer Olympics would be delayed to 2021. Because of this pandemic, all matches were played behind closed doors.

France won their first gold and overall medal with a 3–2 win over the Russian team that competed as the ROC. Argentina won the bronze medal in a narrow 3–2 victory over Brazil.

The medals for the competition were presented by Bernard Rajzman, IOC Member, Olympian, and Silver Medalist, Brazil; and the medalists' bouquets were presented by Ary Graça, FIVB President; Brazil.

Competition schedule

Qualification

Format
The preliminary round was a competition between the twelve teams, who were divided into two pools of six teams. This round, the teams competed in a single round-robin format. The four highest ranked teams in each pool advanced to the knockout stage (quarterfinals).

The knockout stage followed the single-elimination format. The losers of the quarterfinals were eliminated. The quarterfinal winners played in the semifinals. The winners of the semifinals competed for gold medal and the losers played for bronze medal.

Pools composition
Teams were seeded following the serpentine system according to their FIVB World Ranking as of 15 October 2019. FIVB reserved the right to seed the hosts as head of pool A regardless of the World Ranking. Rankings are shown in brackets except the hosts who ranked 10th. The pools were confirmed on 31 January 2020.

Rosters

Venue

Pool standing procedure
In order to establish the ranking of teams after the group stage, the following criteria should be implemented:

 Number of matches won
 Match points
 Sets ratio
 Points ratio
 Result of the last match between the tied teams

Match won 3–0 or 3–1: 3 match points for the winner, 0 match points for the loser
Match won 3–2: 2 match points for the winner, 1 match point for the loser

Referees
The following referees were selected for the tournament.

 Hernán Casamiquela
 Paulo Turci
 Liu Jiang
 Denny Cespedes
 Fabrice Collados
 Daniele Rapisarda
 Shin Muranaka
 Sumie Myoi
 Luis Macias
 Wojciech Maroszek
 Evgeny Makshanov
 Vladimir Simonović
 Juraj Mokrý
 Kang Joo-hee
 Susana Rodríguez
 Hamid Al-Rousi
 Patricia Rolf

Preliminary round
All times are Japan Standard Time (UTC+09:00).
The top four teams in each pool qualified for the quarterfinals.

Pool A

Pool B

Knockout stage
All times are Japan Standard Time (UTC+09:00).
The first ranked teams of both pools played against the fourth ranked teams of the other pool. The second ranked teams faced the second or third ranked teams of the other pool, determined by drawing of lots. The drawing of lots was held after the last match in the preliminary round.

Bracket

Quarterfinals

Semifinals

Bronze medal match

Gold medal match

Final standing

Medalists

Awards
The awards were announced on 7 August 2021.

Statistics leaders
Only players whose teams advanced to the semifinals were ranked.

Best Scorers

Best Spikers

Best Blockers

Best Servers

Best Diggers

Best Setters

Best Receivers

Source: Olympics.com

See also
Volleyball at the Summer Olympics
Volleyball at the 2020 Summer Olympics – Women's tournament

References

External links
Official website

Volleyball at the 2020 Summer Olympics
Men's events at the 2020 Summer Olympics